Mahmud Mutievich Amayev (1916  22 February 1943) was a Chechen sniper in the Red Army during the Second World War, credited with killing an estimated 197 to 253 German soldiers.

Biography 
Amayev was born in the mountain Chechen village of Khimoy in 1916. He worked as a teacher in his native Chechnya, until fall, 1940 when he was drafted into the Red army. And in 1942 he was at the front near Leningrad, Where he became an experienced sniper.

References

Chechen people
Soviet military personnel killed in World War II
Recipients of the Order of the Red Banner
Soviet military snipers
1916 births
1943 deaths